Nathani Heights is a residential skyscraper located in Mumbai, Maharashtra, India. The skyscraper is located near the Mumbai Central railway station, which is one of the busiest in Mumbai. The skyscraper which is 262 m tall was proposed in 2011, and construction started a year later in 2012. The full project was completed in 2020.

Amenities
Nathani Heights is built in central Mumbai, and many views are offered from the building as well. The Mahalaxmi Racecourse, and Arabian Sea can be viewed well from the skyscraper. The skyscraper features many amenities as well like a fully equipped gym, massage rooms, and yoga space. Swimming pools, tennis courts, and jogging tracks are also available in the building.

See also
 List of tallest buildings in Mumbai
 List of tallest buildings in India
 List of tallest buildings and structures in the Indian subcontinent
 List of tallest buildings in Asia
 List of tallest buildings in different cities in India
 List of tallest residential buildings
 List of buildings with 100 floors or more

References

Buildings and structures under construction in India
Residential skyscrapers in Mumbai